Plugger may refer to:

 Precision Lightweight GPS Receiver (PLGR), a US military handheld GPS system colloquially known as the "plugger"
 Flip-flops, a type of footwear similar to sandals but without securing the ankles
 Tony Lockett, a former Australian rules footballer
 Song plugger, a musician employed by a music publisher to promote their songs
 Plugger, known as Lugga in the US, a light blue Caribbean tow truck from Roary the Racing Car

See also  
Pluggers, comic strip